Eqbal-e Sharqi Rural District is a rural district (dehestan) in the Central District of Qazvin County, Qazvin Province, Iran. At the 2006 census, its population was 13,159, in 3,486 families.  The rural district has 16 villages.

References 

Rural Districts of Qazvin Province
Qazvin County